Arfersiorfik Fjord is a large fjord along the western coast of Greenland, between the town of Aasiaat to the north and Nordre Strømfjord to the south. The name of this inlet means "the place where the whale was sighted".

Geography
The islands of Qorsunnitsoq and Tunertooq are on the northern side midway within the fjord. Located along the northern shore of the fjord, near the entrance, is the settlement of Niaqornaarsuk.

See also
List of fjords of Greenland

References

Fjords of Greenland